Borrowed Trouble is a 1948 American Western film directed by George Archainbaud and written by Charles Belden. The film stars William Boyd, Andy Clyde, Rand Brooks, Helen Chapman, Anne O'Neal, John Parrish and Cliff Clark. The film was released on July 23, 1948, by United Artists.

Plot

Cast 
 William Boyd as Hopalong Cassidy
 Andy Clyde as California Carlson
 Rand Brooks as Lucky Jenkins
 Helen Chapman as Lola Blair
 Anne O'Neal as Miss Abott
 John Parrish as Steve Mawson
 Cliff Clark as Dink Davis
 Earle Hodgins as Sheriff
 Herbert Rawlinson as Groves
 Don Haggerty as Lippy
 James Harrison as Rocky
 Clarke Stevens as Henchman
 George Sowards as Henchman
 Eilene Janssen as School Girl
 Nancy Stowe as School Girl 
 Jimmy Crane as Dinky Davis
 Bill O'Leary as School Boy
 Norman Ollestad as School Boy

References

External links 
 
 
 
 

1948 films
American black-and-white films
Films directed by George Archainbaud
United Artists films
American Western (genre) films
1948 Western (genre) films
Hopalong Cassidy films
1940s English-language films
1940s American films